Tomás Carbonell and Donald Johnson were the defending champions, but did not participate together this year.  Carbonell partnered Juan Balcells, losing in the first round.  Johnson partnered Piet Norval and successfully defended his title.

Johnson and Norval won in the final 6–4, 7–5, against David Adams and Joshua Eagle.

Seeds

Draw

Draw

External links
 Draw

Portugal Open
2000 ATP Tour
Estoril Open